Dr. Ezzat Saad El-Sayed El Buraey (born 28 September 1950) is an Egyptian diplomat, served as ambassador of Egypt in Indonesia from 2000 to 2004, assistant Foreign Minister for Asian affairs from 2004 to 2006, ambassador to the Russian Federation, as well as non-resident ambassador to Belarus, Turkmenistan and Tajikistan from 2006 to 2010. He was also the assistant Foreign Minister for the Americas in 2010. El-Sayed was also the former governor of Luxor from August 2011 to June 2013.

References

Living people
Ambassadors of Egypt to Russia
People from Luxor
1950 births